Joseph P. Craig (March 22, 1918 – February 22, 1991) was an American Negro league outfielder in the 1940s.

A native of Darby, Pennsylvania, Craig made his Negro leagues debut in 1945 with the Philadelphia Stars, and played with the Stars again the following season. He died in Darby in 1991 at age 72.

References

External links
 and Seamheads

1918 births
1991 deaths
Philadelphia Stars players
Baseball outfielders
Baseball players from Pennsylvania
People from Darby, Pennsylvania
20th-century African-American sportspeople